Aliidiomarina iranensis is a Gram-negative, slightly halophilic, alkaliphilic, straight rod-shaped and motile bacterium from the genus of Aliidiomarina which has been isolated from wetland from Gomishan in Iran.

References

External links
Type strain of Aliidiomarina iranensis at BacDive -  the Bacterial Diversity Metadatabase

Bacteria described in 2016
Alteromonadales